Walt Disney Studios Park (French: Parc Walt Disney Studios) is the second of two theme parks built at Disneyland Paris in Marne-la-Vallée, France, which opened on 16 March 2002.  It is owned and operated by The Walt Disney Company through its Parks, Experiences and Products division. Upon opening, it was dedicated to show business, movie themes, production, and behind-the-scenes, but in the 2010s, in a similar manner to its sister park, Disney’s Hollywood Studios at Walt Disney World in Florida, it began to distance itself from the original studio backlot theming and entered a new direction of attraction development inspired by iconic Disney stories. In 2019, the park hosted approximately 5.2 million guests. The park is represented by the Earffel Tower, a water tower similar to one that was installed at the Walt Disney Studios lot in Burbank, California.

Dedication

History
Initial plans for a second theme park, named Disney-MGM Studios Europe or Disney-MGM Studios Paris, were scheduled to open in 1995, though these plans were canceled around mid-1992 due to the resort's financial issues at the time. After the resort began to make a profit, these plans were revived on a much smaller scale. The park was announced on 29 September 1999. Construction would officially begin a year later in 2000. Walt Disney Studios Park opened on 16 March 2002.

In the 2019 documentary series The Imagineering Story, Bruce Vaughn, Chief Creative Executive (2007–2016, 2023–present) of Walt Disney Imagineering, described his reaction when he visited the park when it first opened:

In June 2007, a new "studio lot" opened in the Animation Courtyard area of the park, named Toon Studio. It is themed as a "toon backlot", representing the film studio workplace of animated characters, where they produce their animated films. The concept has been created exclusively for Walt Disney Studios Park and features two rides not seen in any other Disney theme park, along with small merchandising locations and many character meet-and-greets. In this expansion phase are Crush's Coaster, a custom-designed Maurer Söhne SC 2000 indoor spinning roller coaster, and Cars Quatre Roues Rallye themed after the 2006 Disney/Pixar film Cars, with the ride taking the form of an enhanced teacups ride. A similar ride is found in Mermaid Lagoon at Tokyo DisneySea. On 22 December 2007, The Twilight Zone Tower of Terror soft-opened with the new Hollywood Boulevard on Production Courtyard. Stitch Live!, imported from Hong Kong Disneyland, replaced the Disney Channel Studio Tour.

In 2009, new entertainment opened at Walt Disney Studios to run alongside Mickey's Magical Party, which began in April 2009. Playhouse Disney – Live on Stage! opened next to Stitch Live! and is presented in French, English and Spanish. Walt Disney Studios opened with a full-size parade called Disney's Cinema Parade, which was themed after popular Disney animated and live-action films. In 2008, the parade was replaced with Disney's Stars 'n' Cars, a smaller version of Disney Stars and Motor Cars Parade, which came from Disney's Hollywood Studios in Walt Disney World in Florida. In August 2010, Toy Story Playland opened to coincide with the new Disney·Pixar film Toy Story 3, "shrinking" guests to the size of a toy. The three attractions are a Half Pipe coaster named RC Racer, a parachute jumpstyle ride named Toy Soldiers Parachute Drop, and a Music Express train named Slinky Dog Zigzag Spin, all themed intricately around the first two Toy Story films.

On 27 February 2018, Bob Iger announced a transformative multi-year expansion, opening in phases from 2021 to 2025 to coincide with the 2024 Summer Olympics in Paris, which will completely transform the park. The cost of this expansion is €2 billion. It will feature new areas based on Marvel, Star Wars and Frozen, all surrounding a new man-made lake.

On 14 March 2020, Walt Disney Studios Park, alongside Disneyland Park, temporarily closed due to the COVID-19 pandemic in France. Both parks reopened on 15 July 2020 with strict rules such as limited guest attendance, social distancing, and mandatory wearing of face masks. The park closed again on 29 October 2020 following a second nationwide lockdown, the resort's original intended reopening on 2 April 2021 was ultimately deferred to 17 June.

On 9 July 2022, Avengers Campus soft opened as the first phase of the aforementioned expansion plans. It opened with the Spider-Man W.E.B. Adventure and the rethemed "Rock 'n' Roller Coaster Avec Aerosmith", known as Avengers Assemble: Flight Force.

Areas

Walt Disney Studios Park is divided into five "studio lots", representing various aspects of film production present at a Hollywood film studio, as well as prominent film franchises.

Front Lot

Front Lot serves as the park's main entrance and is home to most shops and services of the park, the Earffel Tower is located here. The entrance courtyard, La Place des Frères Lumière, is designed in Spanish Colonial Revival style, a style common in Hollywood in the 1930s. It is loosely based on the design of the original Disney Bros. Studios on Hyperion Avenue. The central feature of the courtyard is a large Fantasia fountain. The name of the courtyard is a tribute to the French inventors of cinema.

Front Lot features Disney Studio 1, a covered walkway with shops and restaurants themed after a soundstage with a recreation of a Hollywood street inside.

Restaurants:
 Restaurant en Coulisse (the only opening-day restaurant still operating today)

Shops:
 Walt Disney Studios Store
 Les Légendes d'Hollywood
 Studio Photo

Toon Studio

Toon Studio features attractions and shopping based on Pixar and Walt Disney Animation Studios franchises, including a live show, Mickey and the Magician. When the park originally opened in 2002, the area was known as Animation Courtyard. In 2007, as part of the park's fifth anniversary, two new rides were added: Crush's Coaster and Cars Quatre Roues Rallye. In 2009, the area was expanded with the creation of the Toy Story Playland. In January 2012, construction began on a new Ratatouille-themed ride and restaurant.

In 2021, most of this area's attractions were separated into the newly-named Worlds of Pixar area of the park.

Attractions:
 Animation Celebration is an interactive experience, wherein guests step into the snowy world of Frozen to meet Elsa, Anna, Kristoff, Olaf, and Sven. Guests can also participate in the Animation Academy, where they can be instructed on the hand-drawing of  Disney characters.
 Flying Carpets Over Agrabah is an aerial carousel ride, very similar to the famous Dumbo the Flying Elephant attraction; in this version, the riders sit within magic carpets, acting as extras in the Genie's directorial debut. The attraction is set against a large "movie set" backdrop of Agrabah. This is the only opening-day attraction that remains open to this day.

Entertainment:
The Animagique Theatre is home to Mickey and the Magician, a live-action stage show. Set in the atelier of the titular magician (of Fantasia origin) in 20th century Paris, his apprentice Mickey gets into mischief, as he explores and learns to use his own magic.
During the Christmas season, this show is sometimes temporarily replaced by Mickey's Christmas Big Band. Guests are immersed in Mickey's Jazz Club, where jazz and tap dance meet traditional Christmas songs.

Restaurants:
 Toon Studio Catering Co.

Shops:
 Disney Animation Gallery

Worlds of Pixar
Formerly a part of the Toon Studio section, the Worlds of Pixar area features rides, attractions, shopping, and restaurants based on Pixar's Finding Nemo, Cars, Toy Story, and Ratatouille franchises.

Attractions:
 Crush's Coaster is a spinning roller coaster where guests enter the beached sound stage and film set of Finding Nemo, where Crush invites them to climb aboard sea turtle shells for a ride through memorable scenes from the movie.
 Cars Race Rally is a Zamperla Demolition Derby where guests spin at a Radiator Springs car service station. Their cars are located on four spinning plateaus and they change from one spinning plateau to the next.
Ratatouille: The Adventure is a motion-based trackless dark ride based on the 2007 Disney·Pixar animated film Ratatouille. It opened in a new Paris themed area of the park in conjunction with a new restaurant following the Ratatouille theme.
Cars Road Trip is an abridged version of the defunct Studio Tram Tour, themed after the 2006 Pixar film, Cars. This attraction utilises part of the Studio Tram Tour track, and the "Catastrophe Canyon" portion of the former ride. It has been designed as a "temporary ride to increase park capacity until the new expansions open".
Toy Story Playland
 Toy Soldiers Parachute Drop is a parachute jump ride themed to the Green Army Men from Disney-Pixar's Toy Story movies. Another version of the ride also exists at Hong Kong Disneyland.
 Slinky Dog Zigzag Spin is a Caterpillar-style ride where guest sit in a large ride mechanism resembling Slinky Dog from Disney-Pixar's Toy Story movies. Another version of the ride also exists at Hong Kong Disneyland and Shanghai Disneyland.
 RC Racer is a steel shuttle roller coaster themed around RC from Disney-Pixar's Toy Story movies where guest ride in RC on an orange, half loop track. Another version of the ride also exists at Hong Kong and Shanghai Disneylands.

Restaurants:
 Bistrot Chez Rémy

Shops:
 Chez Marianne (Souvenirs de Paris)
Toy Story Playland
 Toy Story Playland Boutique

Production Courtyard

Production Courtyard's theme revolves around the production aspect of Hollywood movies and the Hollywood mythos, including movie legends. The land contains two distinct parts: Hollywood Boulevard, which features Hollywood-inspired street sets and the ride The Twilight Zone Tower of Terror - A New Dimension of Chills and Place des Stars themed around the production facilities of movie lots, containing Stitch Live!.

Attractions:

 The Studio D, which formerly house Walt Disney Television Studios, hosts a rotation of shows during the year. These have included:
Stitch Live! Is an interactive, living character show where guests communicate with Stitch from Lilo & Stitch.
Disney Junior Dream Factory
The Twilight Zone Tower of Terror - A New Dimension of Chills is a large 13 story free-fall thrill ride where guests enter the fictional Hollywood Tower Hotel, and follow the story inspired by the television series. The finale of the ride involves a series of drops at different lengths. This ride originated at Disney's Hollywood Studios and at Disney California Adventure.

Entertainment:
The Studio Theatre, which formerly housed CinéMagique, hosts a rotation of shows during the year. These have included:
Marvel: Heroes Unite
Merry Jolly Jingle
The Lion King: Rhythm of the Pridelands (playback of recorded show from Frontierland in Disneyland Park for guests unable to secure tickets to watch live)
Various character meet & greets
The Production Courtyard Stage is a semi-permanent outdoor stage, which also hosts a rotation of shows, some of which include projection effects onto the Tower of Terror. Past shows have included:
Stark Expo Presents: Energy for Tomorrow
Star Wars: A Galaxy Far, Far Away
Star Wars: A Galactic Spectacular
Goofy's Incredible Christmas
 #SurpriseMickey
A number of shows have taken place in the open space including The Incredibles' Challenge and Guardians of the Galaxy Awesome Dance-Off.

Restaurants:
Studio Fries Van
Studio Catering Co.

Shops:
Tower Hotel Gifts

Marvel Avengers Campus

Marvel Avengers Campus, a land themed around the Marvel Cinematic Universe, soft opened on 9 July 2022, and opened to the public 20 July 2022. Anchored as a transformed Paris-based secret location for S.H.I.E.L.D., the area's attractions and dining include Avengers Assemble: Flight Force (an Iron Man re-theme of Rock 'n' Roller Coaster Avec Aerosmith) and Spider-Man W.E.B. Adventure (a clone of Web Slingers: A Spider-Man Adventure from the Anaheim version of the land). This area replaced the previous "Backlot" lot of the park.

Attractions:
 Avengers Assemble: Flight Force
 Spider-Man W.E.B. Adventure

Entertainment:
 Training Center
 Heroic Encounters

Restaurants:
 Pym Kitchen
 Stark Factory
 Super Diner
 WEB - Worldwide Eating Brigade
 FANtastic Food Truck

Shops:
 Mission Equipment

Former areas

Backlot 

The Backlot was an opening day lot themed after actual movie backlots with an industrial theme. This lot featured the attractions Rock 'n' Roller Coaster Avec Aerosmith, the Moteurs... Action!: Stunt Show Spectacular, and the special effects show Armageddon – Les Effets Speciaux. The cafeteria service restaurant Blockbuster Café, the buffet Restaurant des Stars, and a small diner Café des Cascadeurs were also part of the Backlot. This area was closed in 2019 to make way for Avengers Campus.

Former Attractions:
 Rock 'n' Roller Coaster Avec Aerosmith was the largest attraction of the area, and an almost exact clone of the ride found at Disney's Hollywood Studios in Orlando, with only a few story aspects changed. The attraction closed on September 2nd, 2019 to make way for Avengers Assemble: Flight Force, which will retain the previous track layout.
 Armageddon – Les Effets Speciaux was a special effects show which showed multiple scenes from the 1998 film Armageddon. The attraction closed on March 31st, 2019 to make way for Spider-Man W.E.B. Adventure.
 Moteurs... Action!: Stunt Show Spectacular was a stunt show found in the land which was showing how action movies were filmed, using car and motorbike stunts. There was also a clone of the attraction at Disney's Hollywood Studios in Orlando which closed in 2015. This attraction closed on March 13, 2020 as the final attraction of the area. The closure was moved earlier due to the COVID-19 pandemic in France, as it was initially planned to stay for a short time longer, but instead closed.

Future areas
On 27 February 2018, Bob Iger announced that The Walt Disney Company will invest €2 billion into the Disneyland Paris resort. The Walt Disney Studios Park will be expanded with three new areas based on Marvel, Frozen and Star Wars. In addition to the three new areas, the expansion includes a new lake, which will be the focal point for entertainment experiences and will also connect each of the new park areas.

Kingdom of Arendelle

The second phase of the expansion will be Kingdom of Arendelle which is scheduled to be open in 2023. Guests will be immersed in the kingdom of Arendelle (set after the events of Frozen and before Frozen II), where Queen Elsa has declared a Summer Snow Day for its citizens. A new and expanded version of Frozen Ever After will debut with the land as well as a restaurant and a shop.

Avatar-themed land

The third and final phase of the expansion will be a land themed to Star Wars which is originally scheduled set to be completed between 2024 and 2025. Multiple sources have claimed that this expansion will be a version of Star Wars: Galaxy's Edge found in Disneyland and Disney's Hollywood Studios. However, Disneyland Paris announced that the Paris version of Star Wars: Galaxy's Edge had been cancelled to make way for Paris version of Pandora – The World of Avatar, which found in Disney's Animal Kingdom Park, since the schedule date had been postponed indefinitely and following the closing of the park due to COVID-19 pandemic in France.

Attendance

Sister park
Walt Disney Studios Park has a "sister park" at Walt Disney World, named Disney's Hollywood Studios, originally Disney-MGM Studios, which opened in 1989. Both parks are themed after film and television production backlots, and have similar attractions. The Earffel Tower, which represents Walt Disney Studios Park, is nearly identical to the original tower that existed on the backlot of Disney's Hollywood Studios from 1989 to 2016.

See also

 Disneyland Park (Paris)
 Disney's Hollywood Studios
 Incidents at Disneyland Paris

References

External links
 WDS Fans – The Secrets, History and Magic of the Studios
 DLRP Magic – Guides to the Park
 Photos Magiques – Walt Disney Studios Park
 Imagineering Files – Disney MGM Studios Europe

 
Walt Disney Parks and Resorts
Amusement parks in France
Disney production studios
Buildings and structures in Seine-et-Marne
Backlot sets
French film studios
Recording studios in France
Tourist attractions in Île-de-France
Tourist attractions in Seine-et-Marne
2002 establishments in France
Buildings and structures in Paris
Amusement parks opened in 2002